Biyka (Biy) is a rural locality (a selo) in and the administrative centre of Biykinskoye Rural Settlement, Turochaksky District, the Altai Republic, Russia. The population was 537 as of 2016. There are 15 streets.

Geography 
Biyka is located 78 km southeast of Turochak (the district's administrative centre) by road. Chuyka is the nearest rural locality.

References 

Rural localities in Turochaksky District